The Diablo Formation is a geologic formation in California. It preserves fossils dating back to the Neogene period.

See also 

 List of fossiliferous stratigraphic units in California
 Paleontology in California

References 

 

Geologic formations of California
Neogene California